Scott Weinger (born October 5, 1975) is an American actor. He is best known as the voice of the Disney character Aladdin in the 1992 animated film and various follow-ups, and as Steve Hale on the ABC sitcom Full House and its Netflix sequel Fuller House. For ABC, he wrote and produced for the television sitcoms Galavant and Black-ish and was a co-executive producer of ABC's The Muppets.

Early life 
Weinger graduated from Harvard University in 1998 magna cum laude with a degree in English and American Literature. He is Jewish.

Career 
Weinger's first professional acting work was a national commercial for Ideal Toys. His first acting role was in Police Academy 5: Assignment Miami Beach. After guest-starring on ABC's Life Goes On, Weinger became a series regular on the situation comedy The Family Man on CBS. His next regular role in a series came as Steve Hale on the sitcom Full House from 1991 to 1995 after he had guest-starred on one episode during its fifth season as the similarly named Steve Peters. During the run of Full House, Weinger made his motion-picture debut as the voice of Aladdin in Disney's 1992 animated feature of the same name.

Weinger went on to several small roles in television programs, starred in a horror comedy film, 2003's Shredder, and provided his voice for Osamu Tezuka's Metropolis and the 3D Disney film Mickey's PhilharMagic. He had a guest appearance on the NBC's Scrubs for the season 6 episode "My Coffee" as Dr. Kershnar. He played Officer Rubin on What I Like About You. From 2016 until 2020, Weinger reprised his role of Steve Hale on the Full House spin-off series Fuller House.

Weinger was cast as Aladdin, the street urchin in Walt Disney Pictures' animated feature film of the same name. He reprised his role multiple times off the big screen including the CBS television series and direct-to-video sequels The Return of Jafar and Aladdin and the King of Thieves. His voice would also be used for several video games including the Kingdom Hearts series, Kinect Disneyland Adventures, and Disney Infinity series.

Weinger has written and produced for television, receiving his first writing credit on the WB television show Like Family. Other writing credits include What I Like About You and Privileged. From 2009 to 2013, he was a writer-producer for 90210, penning the series' 100th episode. After the series ended, he returned to comedy, becoming a writer-producer for The Neighbors, Galavant, Black-ish, and The Muppets.

Personal life 
Weinger has been married to television writer and producer Rina Mimoun since 2008; together they have a son who was born in 2009.

Filmography

Film

Television

Video games

Theme park attractions

Production credits

Writer

Producer

References

External links 

1975 births
Living people
20th-century American male actors
21st-century American male actors
American male child actors
American male film actors
American male television actors
American male television writers
American male video game actors
American male voice actors
American television writers
Harvard College alumni
Jewish American male actors
Male actors from New York City
NSU University School alumni
Screenwriters from New York (state)
Television producers from New York City
21st-century American Jews
Disney people